Sang-e Koti or Sang Koti may refer to:
 Sang-e Koti, Mahmudabad
 Sang Koti, Qaem Shahr